Carlo Luisi (born 20 March 1977) is an Italian footballer who currently plays as a midfielder for Benevento Calcio.

Career
Luisi started his senior career at Renato Curi of Eccellenza. He then played
for Benevento of Serie C2. He won the promotion playoffs in summer 1999, and won a chance to loaned to Serie B newcomer Fermana. He then returned to Benevento in February 2000, and played until summer 2003.

He was signed by hometown club, Serie B newcomer Pescara. In the next season he moved to league rival Piacenza, but loaned back to Pescara in summer 2005.

In summer 2006, he was signed by Modena of Serie B, and Giuseppe Gemiti moved to opposite direction as part of the deal.

In January 2008, he joined Pisa of Serie B. The club finished 6th at the end of season.

In September 2008, he signed a 2-year deal with Ascoli. He swap club with Thomas Job.

On 10 August 2009, he re-joined Modena until June 2011.

References

External links

 Profile at AIC.Football.it 

Italian footballers
Serie B players
Benevento Calcio players
Fermana F.C. players
Delfino Pescara 1936 players
Piacenza Calcio 1919 players
Modena F.C. players
Pisa S.C. players
Ascoli Calcio 1898 F.C. players
Association football midfielders
Sportspeople from Pescara
1977 births
Living people
Footballers from Abruzzo